William Burke Garrett III is a retired lieutenant general in the United States Army who last served as the deputy commander of United States European Command. Prior to that, he served as the deputy commanding general of United States Army Forces Command.

Military career
Garrett became the Deputy Commander of United States European Command in July 2014. Prior to that, he served as Deputy Commanding General and Chief of Staff for United States Army Forces Command in Fort Bragg. He was responsible for manning, equipping, and training 265,000 active component soldiers, and training and readiness oversight of 560,000 soldiers of the Army National Guard and the United States Army Reserve. Garrett also served as Chief of Staff, United States Forces – Iraq and as Commanding General, United States Army Africa and United States Army Southern European Task Force, Vicenza, Italy. Other assignments include tours of duty with: the 6th Infantry Division; 10th Mountain Division; 25th Infantry Division; 82nd Airborne Division; XVIII Airborne Corps; United States Army Combined Arms Center; the United States Special Operations Command; the Army Staff; and the Joint Staff.  He has served operational tours in Grenada, Egypt, Syria, Afghanistan, and Iraq. He was commissioned in the United States Army as an infantry officer after graduating from North Georgia College in Dahlonega, Georgia in 1981.  He is a graduate of the Infantry Officer Basic and Advanced Courses, the United States Army Command and General Staff College, the School of Advanced Military Studies, and the National War College. He holds a Master of Arts degree in Management from Webster University, a Master of Arts degree in Military Art and Science from the U.S. Army Command and General Staff College, and a Master of Science degree in National Security and Strategic Studies from National Defense University. He serves on the board of advisors of the Military Cyber Professionals Association.

Awards and decorations
LTG Garrett has received the following awards:

References

External links

 

Year of birth missing (living people)
Living people
Place of birth missing (living people)
University of North Georgia alumni
Webster University alumni
United States Army Command and General Staff College alumni
National Defense University alumni
United States Army generals
Recipients of the Legion of Merit
Recipients of the Defense Superior Service Medal
Recipients of the Defense Distinguished Service Medal